Zandomeneghi is a surname. Notable people with the surname include:

Federico Zandomeneghi (1841–1917), Italian painter
 (born 1850), Italian sculptor
Pietro Zandomeneghi (1806–1886), Italian sculptor

Italian-language surnames